A - B - C - D - E - F - G - H - I - J - K - L - M - N - O - P - Q - R - S - T - U - V - W - XYZ

This is a list of rivers in the United States that have names starting with the letter F.  For the main page, which includes links to listings by state, see List of rivers in the United States.

Fa - Fe 
Fabius River - Missouri
Fall River - Kansas
Falling Water River - Tennessee
Falls River - Connecticut
Falls River - Michigan
Farmington River - Massachusetts, Connecticut
Fawn River - Indiana, Michigan
Feather River - California

Fi 
Firehole River - Wyoming
Firesteel River - Michigan
First River - New Jersey
First Broad River - North Carolina
Fish River - Alabama
Fish River - Alaska
Fish Hook River - Minnesota
Fisher River - Montana
Fisher River - North Carolina
Five Mile River - Massachusetts
Fishing River - Missouri

Fl 
Flag River - Wisconsin
Flambeau River - Wisconsin
Flat River - Michigan
Flat River - North Carolina
Flat River - Rhode Island (tributary of the South Branch Pawtuxet River)
Flat River - Rhode Island (tributary of the Wood River)
Flathead River - Montana
Flatrock Creek - Indiana, Ohio
Flatrock River - Indiana
Flint River - Alabama, Tennessee
Flint River - Georgia
Flint River - Michigan
Flint Run - West Virginia
Floyd River - Iowa
Floyds Fork - Kentucky (Floyds Fork of the Salt River)
Flushing River - New York

Fo 
Fond du Lac River - Wisconsin
Fore River - Maine
Forest River - North Dakota
Forge River - Massachusetts
Fork River - California
Forked Deer River - Tennessee
Fortymile River - Alaska
Fossil Creek - Arizona
Fourche River - Arkansas
Fourche La Fave River - Arkansas
Fourche Maline - Oklahoma
Fourteen Mile Creek - Indiana
Fowl River - Alabama
Fowler River - New Hampshire
Fox River - Southern Illinois
Fox River - Wisconsin, Northern Illinois
Fox River - Wisconsin

Fr 
Frankstown Branch Juniata River - Pennsylvania
Fraser River - Colorado
Frazier Brook - New Hampshire
Fremont River - Utah
French Creek - New York, Pennsylvania
French Creek - South Dakota
French River - Massachusetts, Connecticut
French Broad River - North Carolina, Tennessee
Fresh Kills - New York
Fresh River - New Hampshire
Fresno River - California
Frio River - Texas
Fryingpan River - Colorado

F